Diyadin District is a district of Ağrı Province of Turkey. Its seat is the town Diyadin. Its area is 1,351 km2, and its population is 40,286 (2021). The current District Governor is Mustafa Karali.

Composition
There is one municipality in Diyadin District:
 Diyadin

There are 62 villages in Diyadin District:

 Akçevre
 Akyolaç
 Altınkilit
 Aşağıakpazar
 Aşağıdalören
 Aşağıkardeşli
 Aşağıtütek
 Atadamı
 Atayolu
 Batıbeyli
 Boyalan
 Budak
 Burgulu
 Büvetli
 Davutköy
 Dedebulak
 Delihasan
 Dibekli
 Dokuztaş
 Gedik
 Göğebakan
 Gözüpek
 Günbuldu
 Hacıhalit
 Heybeliyurt
 Isaağa
 Kapanca
 Karapazar
 Karataş
 Kocaçoban
 Kotancı
 Kuşburnu
 Kuşlu
 Mollakara
 Mutlu
 Oğuloba
 Omuzbaşı
 Pirali
 Rahmankulu
 Satıcılar
 Soğuksu
 Sürenkök
 Sürmelikoç
 Şahinşah
 Şekerbulak
 Taşbasamak
 Taşkesen
 Tazekent
 Toklucak
 Ulukent
 Uysallı
 Yanıkçukur
 Yeniçadır
 Yeşildurak
 Yıldırım
 Yıldız
 Yolcupınarı
 Yörükatlı
 Yukarı Akpazar
 Yukarı Dalören
 Yukarı Tütek
 Yuva

References

Districts of Ağrı Province